German submarine U-1052 was a Type VIIC U-boat of Nazi Germany's Kriegsmarine during World War II.

She was ordered on 5 June 1941, and was laid down on 8 February 1943 at Friedrich Krupp Germaniawerft AG, Kiel, as yard number 686. She was launched on 16 December 1943 and commissioned under the command of Oberleutnant zur See Friedrich Weidner on 20 January 1944.

Design
German Type VIIC submarines were preceded by the shorter Type VIIB submarines. U-1052 had a displacement of  when at the surface and  while submerged. She had two shafts and two  propellers.

U-1052 was fitted with five  torpedo tubes (four fitted at the bow and one at the stern), fourteen torpedoes or 26 TMA mines, one  SK C/35 naval gun, (220 rounds), one  Flak M42 and two twin  C/30 anti-aircraft guns. The boat had a complement of between 44 — 52 men.

Service history
U-1052 collided with the coaster Saude on 13 November 1944, south of Bergen. Saude sank when U-1052 went astern and pulled her bow out of the rupture in Saudes hull.

On 9 May 1945, U-1052 surrendered at Bergen, Norway. She was later transferred to Loch Ryan, Scotland on 30 May 1945. Of the 156 U-boats that eventually surrendered to the Allied forces at the end of the war, U-1052 was one of 116 selected to take part in Operation Deadlight. U-1052 was towed out on 9 December 1945, and sunk by aircraft of the RN's 816 Squadron.

References

Bibliography

External links

German Type VIIC submarines
U-boats commissioned in 1944
World War II submarines of Germany
Ships built in Kiel
1943 ships
Maritime incidents in November 1944
Maritime incidents in December 1945
World War II shipwrecks in the Atlantic Ocean
Operation Deadlight
Submarines sunk by aircraft as targets